The Roig Arena (previously proposed as Casal España Arena ) is a multipurpose indoor arena planned to open in 2024 in Valencia, Spain.

History and description 
The plot is located between the streets Ángel Villena, Bomber Ramón Duart and Antonio Ferrandis, next to La Fonteta; it was used as parking lot for the attendants to the former venue and L'Alqueria. The arena is being funded by Juan Roig, who created the company Licampa 1617 S.L. in order to carry out the project. After a 50-year concession, the facilities will revert to the municipality. It will host matches for the 2028 European Men's Handball Championship.

The venue is expected to have a capacity of 15,600 for basketball fixtures and 18,600 for concerts. It will also feature around 1,300 parking spaces.

Building works started on 29 June 2020.

In 2020 the arena was expected to open in 2023, but was later delayed to 2024. It is expected to replace La Fonteta as main venue of Valencia Basket.

See also
 List of indoor arenas in Spain

References 

Sports venues in Valencia
Indoor arenas in Spain
Proposed indoor arenas
Indoor arenas under construction